The Trentino-Alto Adige/Südtirol regional election of 1978 took place on 19 November 1978.

The alliance DC-SVP continued with the Democratic Socialists.

Results

Regional Council

Source: Trentino-Alto Adige/Südtirol Region

Province of Trento

Source: Trentino-Alto Adige/Südtirol Region

Province of Bolzano

Source: Trentino-Alto Adige/Südtirol Region

Elections in Trentino-Alto Adige/Südtirol
1978 elections in Italy